Gilpatric is a surname. Notable people with the surname include:

Guy Gilpatric (1896–1950), American pilot, flight instructor, journalist, and writer
Roswell Gilpatric (1906–1996), American lawyer and Deputy Secretary of Defense